Bobki is the name of several rural localities in Russia:
Bobki (village), Perm Krai, a village in Dobryansky District, Perm Krai
Bobki (settlement), Perm Krai, a settlement in Dobryansky District, Perm Krai